Jim Thorpe (1887–1953) was an American athlete and Olympic gold medalist.

Jim Thorpe may also refer to:
Jim Thorpe, Pennsylvania, United States
Jim Thorpe (golfer) (born 1949), American professional golfer
Jim Thorpe (Australian footballer) (1884–1962), Australian rules footballer
Jim Thorpe (Canadian football) (1944–2020), American player of Canadian football 
Jimmy Thorpe (1913–1936), English footballer

See also

James Thorpe (disambiguation)